Torture Tactics is an EP recorded by the San Francisco Bay Area thrash metal band Vio-lence in 1991. It was released originally on Megaforce Records and the studio tracks are old songs from the demo times of Vio-lence.

The song "Torture Tactics" was deleted from the previous album; however, it can be found on the Japanese edition of Oppressing the Masses. This EP is the only release besides the Japanese edition of Oppressing the Masses to include "Torture Tactics."

"Officer Nice (live)" was a fake live track. The live intro is taken from Vio-lence's Hallandale, FL show from August 1988. "Dicks of Death" and "Gutterslut" were the two outtakes from the 1989 Oppressing the Masses sessions.

Track listing

Credits
Sean Killian - vocals
Phil Demmel - lead guitar
Robb Flynn - rhythm guitar
Dean Dell - bass
Perry Strickland - drums

References

1991 EPs
Vio-lence albums
Megaforce Records EPs
Thrash metal EPs